The Spanish Republic, historiographically referred to as the First Spanish Republic, was the political regime that existed in Spain from 11 February 1873 to 29 December 1874.

The Republic's founding ensued after the abdication of King Amadeo on 10 February 1873. On the next day the republic was proclaimed by a parliamentary majority made up of radicals, republicans and democrats. The period was beset by tensions between federal republicans and unitarian republicans. The period also saw the end of compulsory conscription, the regulation of child labor and the abolition of slavery in Puerto Rico. The government inherited a state of war, the so-called Third Carlist War, ongoing since 1872, and the Ten Years' War, ongoing since 1868, to which the Cantonal rebellion added up in 1873.

The January 1874 coup of Pavía ousted the government, giving way to a praetorian republic under General Serrano. In December 1874, General Arsenio Martínez Campos staged a pronunciamiento in Sagunto, which delivered the coup de grâce to the Republic and brought the Bourbon Restoration.

Overview 
The Constituent Cortes was called upon to write a federal constitution. The radicals preferred a unitary republic, with a much lesser role for the provinces, and once the republic had been declared the two parties turned against each other. Initially, the radicals were largely driven from power, joining those who had already been driven out by the revolution of 1868 or by the Carlist War.

The first republican attempt in the history of Spain was a short experience, characterized by profound political and social instability and violence. The Republic was governed by four distinct presidents—Estanislao Figueras, Francesc Pi i Margall, Nicolás Salmerón, Emilio Castelar; then, only eleven months after its proclamation, General Manuel Pavía led a coup d'état and established a unified republic dominated by Francisco Serrano.

The period was marked by three simultaneous civil wars: the Third Carlist War, the Cantonal Revolution, the Petroleum Revolution in Alcoy; and by the Ten Years' War in Cuba. The gravest problems for the consolidation of the regime were the lack of true republicans, their division between federalists and unitarians, and the lack of popular support. Subversion in the army, a series of local cantonalist risings, instability in Barcelona, failed anti-federalist coups, calls for revolution by the International Workingmen's Association, the lack of any broad political legitimacy, and personal in-fighting among the republican leadership all further weakened the republic.

The Republic effectively ended on 3 January 1874, when the Captain General of Madrid, Manuel Pavía, pronounced against the federalist government and called on all parties except Federalists and Carlists to form a national government. The monarchists and Republicans refused, leaving the unitary Radicals and Constitutionalists as the only group willing to govern; again a narrow political base. General Francisco Serrano formed a new government and was appointed President of the Republic although it was a mere formality since the Cortes had been dissolved.

Carlist forces managed to expand the territory under their control to the greatest extent in early 1874, though a series of defeats by the republic's northern army in the second half of the year might have led to the end of the war had it not been for bad weather. However the other monarchists had taken the name of Alfonsists as supporters of Alfonso, the son of the former Queen Isabel, and were organised by Cánovas del Castillo.

This period of the Republic lasted until Brigadier Martínez-Campos pronounced for Alfonso in Sagunto on 29 December 1874 and the rest of the army refused to act against him. The government collapsed, leading to the end of the republic and the restoration of the Bourbon monarchy with the proclamation of Alfonso XII as king.

Proclamation of the Republic 

King Amadeo I abdicated from the Spanish throne on 11 February 1873. His decision was mainly due to the constant difficulties he had to face during his short tenure, as the Ten Years' War, the outbreak of the Third Carlist War, the opposition from alfonsino monarchists, which hoped for the Bourbon Restoration in the person of Alfonso, son of Isabella II, the many republican insurrections and the division among his own supporters.

The Spanish Cortes, which were assembled in a joint and permanent session of both the Congress of Deputies and the Senate, declared themselves the National Assembly while waiting for any final notice from the King. The overwhelming majority was with the monarchists from the two dynastic parties that had exercised the government until then: the Radical Democratic Party of Manuel Ruiz Zorrilla and the Constitutional Party of Práxedes Mateo Sagasta. There also was a small republican minority in the National Assembly, ideologically divided between federalism and centralism. One of them, Federal Democratic Republican Party member Francisco Pi y Margall moved the following proposal: "The National Assembly assumes powers and declares the Republic as the form of government, leaving its organization to the Constituent Cortes."

In his speech for the proposal (to which he was a signatory, along with Figueras, Salmerón, and other opponents), Pi y Margall—himself a federalist—renounced for the moment to establish a federal republic, hoping the would-be-assembled Constituent Cortes to decide over the issue, and announced his acceptance of any other democratic decision. Then another republican, Emilio Castelar, took the floor and said:

After Castelar's powerful speech, amidst passionate applause, the Republic was declared with a resignation of the monarchists, with 258 votes in favour and only 32 against: "The National Assembly assumes all powers and declares the Republic as the form of government of Spain, leaving its organization to the Constituent Cortes. An Executive Power shall be elected directly by the Cortes, and it shall be responsible to the same."

In the same session, the first government of the Republic was elected. Federal republican Estanislao Figueras was elected the first "President of the Executive Power", an office incorporating the heads of State and Government. No "President of the Republic" was ever elected, as the Constitution creating such office was never enacted. In his speech, Figueras said that the Republic "was like a rainbow of peace and harmony of all Spaniards of good will."

The passage of these resolutions surprised and stunned most Spaniards, as the recently elected Cortes (now National Assembly) had a wide majority of monarchists. Ruiz Zorrilla spoke in these terms: "I protest and will keep doing so, even if I'm left on my own, against those representatives that having come to the Cortes as constitutional monarchists feel themselves authorized to make the decision to turn the nation from monarchist to republican overnight."

For most monarchists, though, the impossibility of restoring Isabella II as Queen, and the youth of the future Alfonso XII made the Republic the only, though transitory, viable course of action, particularly given the inevitable failure that awaited it.

Figueras government 
The first government of the Republic was formed of federalists and progressives who had been ministers during the monarchy. Four ministers, in particular, had served with King Amadeo: Echegaray (Finance), Becerra (War), Fernández de Córdoba (Navy) and Berenguer (Infrastructure).

At the beginning, they were plagued by a terrible economic situation, with a 546M peseta budgetary deficit, 153M in debts requiring immediate payment and only 32M available to fulfill them. The Artillery Corps had been dissolved in the most virulent moment of the Carlist and Cuban wars, for which there were not enough soldiers or armament, nor money to feed or purchase them. Besides, Spain was going through a deep economic crisis matching the Panic of 1873 and which was exacerbated by the political instability. In previous years, unemployment had risen steeply amongst field and industrial workers, and proletarian organizations responded with strikes, demonstrations, protest rallies and the occupation of abandoned lands.

On 23 February the newly elected Speaker of the National Assembly, radical Cristino Marcos, plotted a failed coup d'etat in which the Civil Guard occupied the Ministry of Governance and the National Militia surrounded the Congress of Deputies, in order to establish a unitary republic. This prompted the first remodeling of the government in which the progressives were ousted and replaced with federalists. Twelve days after the establishment of the Republic, compulsory military service was removed and voluntary service set up with a daily salary of 1 peseta and one crust (loaf?) of bread. A Republican volunteers corps was also established with an enlistment salary of 50 pesetas and a daily salary of 2 pesetas and 1 crust of bread.

The second Figueras government had to face the attempt of proclamation of the Estat Català inside the Spanish Federal Republic on 9 March which was overcome by a series of telegraphic contacts between the government and the Catalan leaders. On 23 April a new coup attempt was set in motion; this time by a collusion of alfonsino monarchists, members of the old Liberal Union and monarchic sectors of the Army; but failed when several units refrained from supporting it at the last hour.

Francisco Pi y Margall is usually considered the heart of this government, which had to face several problems already endemic to the Republic, such as the Third Carlist War, separatist insurrections (this time from Catalonia), military indiscipline, monarchic plots, etc. His government dissolved the National Assembly and summoned Constituent Cortes for 1 May. On 23 April Cristino Martos, Speaker of the old National Assembly, attempted a new coup, now supported by the Civil Governor of Madrid: a battalion of militiamen took positions along the Paseo del Prado, and four thousand more perfectly armed volunteers gathered near Independence Square under the pretext of passing review. Having heard from the plot, Pi i Margall mobilized the Civil Guard. For his part, after the Minister of War appointed Baltasar Hidalgo as the new Captain General for Madrid, he ordered Brigadier Carmona and a battalion of infantry and various artillery and cavalry units, to march on the militiamen. The coup d'état failed as soon as it started, and the government dissolved the military units participating and the Permanent Committee of the Assembly.

The writs were issued for Constituent Cortes elections on 10 May which resulted 343 seats for federal republicans and 31 for the rest of the political forces. The elections themselves developed in a quite unorthodox environment, and the resulting representation was ridiculous, as most factions in Spain did not participate: the Carlists were still waging war against the Republic, while the alfonsino monarchists of Antonio Cánovas del Castillo, the unitary republicans and even the incipient workers' organization close to the First International all called for abstention. The result was clearly favourable to the federal republicans, which captured 343 of the 371 seats, but turnout was probably the lowest in Spanish history, with about 28% in Catalonia and 25% in Madrid.

The Federal Republic 
On 1 June 1873 the first session of the Constituent Cortes was opened and the presentation of resolutions began. The first one was debated on the seventh of June, written by seven representatives: "First Article. The form of government of the Spanish Nation is the Democratic Federal Republic".

The president, having carried out the Cortes' regulations for the definite approval of proposal of law, arranged to hold a nominal vote the next day. The resolution was passed 8 June by a favorable vote of 219 representatives and only 2 against, and the Federal Republic was thus declared. Most of the federalists in parliament supported a Swiss-like confederative model, with regions directly forming independent cantons. Spanish writer Benito Pérez Galdós, aged 21 at the time, wrote about the parliamentary atmosphere of the First Republic:

The situation reached such levels of surrealism that, while presiding over a Cabinet session, Estanislao Figueras yelled: "Gentlemen, I can't stand this any more. I am going to be frank with you: I'm fed up with all of us!" So fed up that on 10 June he left his resignation letter in his office, went for a walk through the Parque del Buen Retiro and, without telling anyone, boarded the first train departing from the Atocha Station. He would only step down upon arriving in Paris.

The government of Pi i Margall 

After Figueras' flight to France, the power vacuum created was tempting general Manuel Sodas into starting a pronunciamiento when a Civil Guard colonel, José de la Iglesia, showed up at Congress and declared that nobody would leave until a new president was elected. Figueras' fellow federalist and government minister Francisco Pi y Margall was elected on 11 June, but on his speech to the Assembly he declared he was at a complete loss and without a program. The main efforts of the new government focused on the drafting of the new Constitution and some social character-related bills:
 Apportionment of disamortized lands among lessees, settlers and aparceros.
 Reestablishment of the regular Army, with mandatory conscription.
 Separation of Church and State, which had been deeply intertwined under Ferdinand VII and only slightly separated by Isabella II.
 Abolition of slavery throughout the nation. Though the 1812 Cádiz Constitution had already taken some steps on the issue, the colonies remained opposed to the move from mainland Spain. Also, plans were made to limit child labor.
 Establishment of a system ensuring free and compulsory education.
 Legalization of the right of syndication, creation of mixed workers-managers juries and establishment of the 8 hours work day.

On 16 June a 25-member Committee was set up by the Cortes to study the draft Constitution of the Federal Republic of Spain, the redaction of which is mainly attributed to Emilio Castelar, with debate starting the following day. On 28 June Pi i Margall renewed the composition of his government, but due to the slow pace of the constitutional debates in the Cortes, events came crashing down on the government at a stunning pace. On 30 June the City Council of Seville passed a motion declaring the town a Social Republic, and the next day many federalist deputies left the Cortes in protest. About a week later, on 9 July, Alcoy followed suit, when during a strike directed by local leaders of the First International, the police fired to the gathered workers who responded by taking up arms and gaining control of the city. These events became known as the Petroleum Revolution.

 Shortly after, the Cantonal Rebellion swept across Spain with the federalist sentiment giving rise to several independent cantons. Uprisings were daily news in the south-eastern area of Valencia, Murcia and Andalusia. Some cantons were provincial in nature, like Valencia or Málaga, but most comprised just a city and its surroundings, like the more localised cantons of Alcoy, Cartagena, Seville, Cádiz, Almansa, Torrevieja, Castellón, Granada, Salamanca, Bailén, Andújar, Tarifa and Algeciras. Even smaller were the village-based cantons of Camuñas (in Albacete) and Jumilla (in Murcia). The latter is said to have issued a manifesto stating:

There is, however, no record of such a manifesto, nor of any similar declaration, in the municipal archives; and the proceedings of the time seemed to be within normality. This has motivated several historians to deny the authenticity of the manifesto and even the very existence of the Jumilla canton, stating that its invention was merely a form of anti-republican propaganda.

The most active – and known – of the cantons was the Canton of Cartagena, its autonomy declared on 12 July at the city naval base under the inspiration of the federalist congressman Antonio Gálvez Arce, known as Antonete. The Canton of Cartagena would live six months of constant wars, and even minted its own currency, the duro cantonal.

The first deed of the Cartagenan cantonalists was the capture of the Saint Julian castle, which motivated a strange telegram sent by the city's captain-general to the Minister of the Navy: "Saint Julian castle shows Turkish flag". Such "Turkish flag" was in fact the cantonal flag, the first red flag in Spanish history (the Ottoman Civil Ensign was a plain red flag, hence the captain-general's terminology). Gálvez's passionate speeches allowed him to gain control of the Navy ships docked in the city, which at that time were among the best in the Spanish Navy. Under his command, the fleet wreaked havoc on the nearby Mediterranean shore, causing the Madrid government to declare him a pirate and set a bounty on his head. Back on land, he led an expedition towards Madrid that was defeated at Chinchilla.

Two cantonal frigates, the Almansa and the Vitoria, set sail towards a "foreign power" (the Spanish city of Almería) for fund-raising. As the city would not pay, it was bombarded and taken by the cantonalists. General Contreras, commanding officer of the cantonal fleet, ordered the Marcha Real to be played as he unboarded. Afterwards, the deed would be repeated in Alicante, but on the trip back to Cartagena they were captured as pirates by the armoured frigates HMS Swiftsure and SMS Friedrich Karl, under the UK and German flags respectively.

An even worse problem was the Third Carlist War, in which the rebels controlled most of the Basque Country, Navarre and Catalonia without opposition, and sent raid parties throughout the Peninsula. The Carlist pretender, Charles VII, had formed a rival government in Estella with his own ministers and was already minting currency, while the French connivance allowed him to receive external aid and fortify his defences. Between the Carlists and the cantonal revolution, the actual territory in which the short-lived Republic exerted undisputed authority did not extend much further than the province of Madrid itself and North-Western Spain, as cantonal uprisings took place as far north as Ávila.

Due to the rapid pace of the events, and without time for the new Constitution to be passed by the Cortes, Pi i Margall found himself between a rock and the proverbial hard place of the cantonal revolution. However, the effective Commander in Chief of the Republic rejected all calls, from both military and political instances, to exert repression on the cantonal uprisings, as he argued they were just following his very own doctrine. Thus, he was forced to resign on 18 July after just 37 days in office. He would later sorely describe his experience as premier:

Drafting the Federal Constitution
The draft of the Federal Constitution of the First Republic of Spain developed at length into 117 articles organized under 17 titles.

In the first article, the following is found:

Composing the Spanish Nation the states of Andalucía Alta, Andalucía Baja, Aragón, Asturias, Baleares, Canarias, Castilla la Nueva, Castilla la Vieja, Cataluña, Cuba, Extremadura, Galicia, Murcia, Navarra, Puerto Rico, Valencia, Regiones Vascongadas. The states will be able to conserve the actual provinces and modify them, according to their territorial necessities.

These states would have "complete economic-administrative autonomy and political autonomy compatible with the existence of the nation" such as "the ability to give it a political constitution" (articles 92 and 93).

The constitutional draft anticipated in Title IV—in addition to the classic Legislative Power, Executive Power and Judicial Power—a fourth Relational Power that would be exercised by the president of the Republic.

Legislative Power would be in the hands of the Federal Cortes, which would be composed of the Congress and the Senate. Congress was to be a house of proportional representation with one representative "for every 50,000 souls", renewing every two years. The Senate was to be a house of territorial representation, four senators being elected by the Cortes of each one of the states.

Executive Power would be exercised by the Ministry of Advisors, whose president would be elected by the president of the republic.

Article 40 of the draft stated: "In the political organization of the Spanish nation, all things individual are the pure domain of the individual; all things municipal are that of the municipality; all things regional are that of the state; and all things national, of the Federation." The following article declared that "All powers are elective, revocable, and accountable", and Article 42 that "Sovereignty resides in all citizens, which they exercise by their own representation by the political organizations of the Republic, constituted through universal suffrage."

Judicial Power would reside in the Federal Supreme Court, which would be composed "of three magistrates for each state of the federation" (Article 73) that would never be elected by the Executive Power or the Legislative Power. It also would establish that all courts would be profession and the judicial institution for all classes of representatives.

Relational Power would be exercised by the president of the Federal Republic whose mandate would last "four years, not being immediately reeligible", as says Article 81 of the draft.

The government of Nicolás Salmerón 
After accepting the resignation of Pi i Margall, Nicolás Salmerón was elected president of the Executive Power, with 119 votes in favor and 93 votes against.

The new president, who was a moderate federalist republican, defended the necessity of arriving at an understanding with the more moderate or conservative groups and a slow transition toward a federal republic. His oratory was crushing: Francisco Silvela said that in his speeches, Salmerón only used one weapon—artillery. Antonio Maura characterized the professorial tone of Don Nicolás, saying that "it always seemed that he was addressing the metaphysicists of Albacete."

Already during his stints as Minister of Mercy and Justice in the government of Estanislao Figueras, he brought about the abolition of the death penalty, even the independence of judicial power in the face of the political.

His nomination produced an intensification of the cantonal movement, which to control he had to resort to generals openly against the Federal Republic, sending military expeditions to Andalucía and Valencia under the respective command of generals Pavía and Martínez Campos. One after another the separate cantons were subdued, except that of Cartagena, which resisted until 12 January 1874.

His generals asked the "awareness" of the government and his signature to execute various death sentences on various deserting soldiers on the Carlist front; according to them, this was essential to reestablishing discipline on the army. Salmerón, man of very advanced liberal principles, declined to concede the "awareness" and, as is written on the wall of his mausoleum, "abandoned power to not sign a death sentence." In this way, he resigned on 6 September.

The government of Emilio Castelar 
The next day, 7 September, the man elected to occupy the presidency of the Executive Power was unitarian Emilio Castelar, professor of History and distinguished orator, by 133 votes in favor against the 67 obtained by Pi y Margall. During his previous time as Minister of State in the government of Estanislao Figueras, Castelar promoted and achieved the approval of the abolition of slavery in the overseas territory of Puerto Rico, although not in Cuba because of the continuing war situation. This act by the First Spanish Republic is commemorated in Puerto Rico up to the present day.

Motivated by the difficult situation through which the Republic was passing, with the aggravation of the Carlist War, Emilio Castelar commenced the reorganization of the army, announcing before the Cortes "to sustain this form of government, I need much infantry, much cavalry, much artillery, much Civil Guard, and many riflemen." In spite of the federalist opposition, the Cortes conceded to him extraordinary powers to govern, after which they closed the Cortes on 20 September. He confirmed the death sentences that provoked the resignation of his predecessor, reestablished order, and was at the point of surrendering to the cantonalists of Cartagena.

Without doubt, the chaos incited by the cantonal revolt and the worsening of the Carlist War led them to reopen the Cortes on 2 January 1874, in order to bring to a vote the management and ask for unlimited powers with which to save the Republic from complete discredit.

In effect, the Cortes session opened on 2 January 1874, but the federalists rose up against Don Emilio Castelar, who was supported by the captain general of Madrid, Don Manuel Pavía, former supporter of Prim, with whom he had rebelled in Villarejo de Salvanés. Two very different forces threatened to interrupt the deliberations of the Cortes: the federalists, eager to finish Castelar with mighty wrath, and the troops of General Pavía, supporter of Castelar, who had decided to show up in his support to avoid his defeat before the federalists.

The committed regiments had already left at the captain general's orders when the Cortes recognized Castelar's defeat by 119 votes against 101. The former president of the Republic, and the president of the Cortes,  Nicolás Salmerón, called for a new vote to elect a new chief of the Executive Power.

Pavía situated himself in front of the building with his staff and ordered two adjutants to impose upon Salmerón the dissolution of the Cortes session and the evacuation of the building in five minutes. The Civil Guard, which guarded the Congress, put into action the general's orders and occupied the halls of Congress (without entering the floor). It was 6:55 in the morning, when the vote to elect the federalist candidate Eduardo Palance was proceeding, and Salmerón, upon receiving the captain general's order, suspended the vote and communicated the grave situation to the representatives. The representatives abandoned the building with all speed, amidst scenes of exaggerated hysterics; some even threw themselves out the windows. Pavía, surprised, asked: "But gentlemen, Why jump out the windows when you can leave through the door?"

Pavía, who was a unitarian republican, offered to allow Emilio Castelar to continue in the presidency, but he refused, not wanting to maintain power through undemocratic means. These acts signified the unofficial end of the First Republic, although it officially continued for almost a year.

The unitary republic 
At the same time as the political convulsions were taking place, General López Domínguez entered into Cartagena on 12 January, replacing Martínez Campos, while Antonete Gálvez, with more than a thousand men, struggled to elude him near the border of Numancia (Numantia) and set course for Oran, (Algeria). The end of the cantonal experience was marked by Gálvez with his exile, but the Bourbon Restoration permitted him through amnesty to return to his native Torreagüera. In this period he would strike up a strange and warm friendship with Don Antonio Cánovas del Castillo, most responsible for the Restoration, who considered Gálvez a sincere, honorable, and valiant man, although one of exaggerated political ideas.

Meanwhile, after Emilio Castelar's refusal to continue as president, he put General Serrano, recently returned from his exile in Biarritz for his implication in the attempted coup of 23 April, in charge of the formation of a coalition government that grouped together monarchists, conservatives, and unitarian republicans, but excluded federalist republicans.

Francisco Serrano, Duke of Torre, 63 years old, former collaborator of Isabel II, had already twice freed the leadership of the state. He proclaimed the Unitary Republic, taking control of the presidency of the Executive Power, and dispensing with the Cortes in a conservative republican dictatorship. During his mandate he once and for all subdued the cantonal insurrections, and that of Cartagena, and concentrated his forces on the Carlist War in the north of Spain. The general attempted without success to consolidate power to himself in dictatorship form, following the example of the regime of dukes and generals that prevailed in France upon the fall of Napoleon III and after the defeat of the Paris Commune.

In just a few months, on 13 May, Serrano ceded the presidency of the government to Juan de Zavala y de la Puente to personally take control of the operations against the Carlists in the north. Práxedes Mateo Sagasta took charge of the government on 3 September. On 10 December the siege of Pamplona began, but it was interrupted by the Proclamation of Sagunto.

The end of the Republic 
On 29 December 1874 in Sagunto, General Arsenio Martínez Campos came out in favor of the restoration to the throne of the Bourbon monarchy in the personage of Don Alfonso de Borbón, son of Isabel II. The government of Sagasta did not oppose this announcement, permitting the restoration of the monarchy. The triumph of the Bourbon Restoration succeeded thanks to the previous work of Antonio Cánovas del Castillo, which without a doubt was contrary to military rule.

Until 1931, the Spanish republicans celebrated the 11 February anniversary of the First Republic. Thereafter, the commemoration was moved to 14 April, the anniversary of the proclamation of the Second Republic in 1931.

See also 
Second Spanish Republic

Footnotes

Further reading
 Brandt, Joseph A. (1977) Toward the New Spain: the Spanish Revolution of 1868 and the First Republic
 Carr, Raymond, ed. (2001) Spain: a History

External links
 Historiaantiqua. Primera República (2008) 

Spanish Republic, First
Spanish Republic, First
First Spanish Republic
Republicanism in Spain
States and territories established in 1873
States and territories disestablished in 1874
1873 establishments in Spain
1874 disestablishments in Spain